The Church of Santa Catalina de Alejandria  informally known as the Namacpacan Church  is a Roman Catholic Church located in Luna (formerly Namacpacan), La Union, Philippines under the jurisdiction of the Roman Catholic Diocese of San Fernando de La Union. Formerly called as Luna Church, the church named in honor of Saint Catherine of Alexandria in 1690 and known for its devotion to the Our Lady of Immaculate Conception of Namacpacan. 

The church building was declared a National Cultural Treasure by the National Museum of the Philippines.

History 

Since 1587, Namacpacan was a visita of Purao (presently known as Balaoan). In November 25, 1690, the town was founded and a parish under the advocacy of Saint Catherine of Alexandria was canonically erected. The first church of Namacpacan was built under the supervision of Father Mateo Bustillos, the parish priest from 1695 to 1697. The original site of the church was in Darigayos, a barrio of Namacpacan and was transferred in 1741 to its present site. The image of the Our Lady of Namacpacan was enshrined in the church in 1871.

The church was reinforced with masonry and galvanized iron roof. It was heavily destroyed by an earthquake in 1854. Through the efforts of Father Marcelino Ceballes, the church was restored and the convent was widened in 1876.

Like other Philippine churches built in earthquake-prone areas, Namacpacan Church is classified as an Earthquake Baroque church with thick walls and buttresses connected to a brick exterior stairway of different designs and shapes. A ceremonial archway or capilla possa can be found at the church's entrance. Its 1872 white and yellow facade falls under the Baroque style with the presence of rounded pediments. Three sets of two pairs of engaged columns and two sets of single columns along with twin belfries adorning the façade. A wooden altar, Spanish-era stone pulpit and a wood relief of the Baptism of Christ, probably polychromed, can be found inside the church.

Its convento is now used as a school.

Marian cult and veneration

History 
The wooden image of the Blessed Virgin Mary venerated as the Our Lady of Immaculate Conception of Namacpacan (locally known as Apo Baket) in Luna was ordered from Spain by an Augustinian priest assigned in the Immaculate Conception Seminary in Vigan in 1871. While on its way to Vigan, the galleon ship from Mexico carrying the image of our Lady took shelter in Darigayos due to a storm. When the sea was calm, they resumed their journey but strong winds forced them to return to the port of Darigayos. The captain of the ship decided to send the image by land and it was temporarily placed in the church's convent. However, the image was too heavy to be transferred onwards overland. Father Camilo Naves, an Augustinian priest, interpreted the incident as meaning that the image of the Virgin Mary wished to be enshrined in the town of Namacpacan. Father Marcelino Ceballos, then parish priest requested to the Augustinian priest to give the image to the town. Upon the agreement that the people of Namacpacan would reimburse all expenses incurred during the image's journey from Spain, the rightful owner gave the image to the town. The people welcomed the Virgin to town with feasting, and enshrined it on an altar in the northern part of the church. 

Pope John XXIII granted a pontifical decree of coronation to Bishop Juan Callanta y Sison on 7 September 1959, signed by Canon Secretary, Giulio Barbella and notarized by Secretary of Apostolic Dataria, Marco Martini. The image was canonically crowned on 24 November 1959 by the Apostolic Nuncio to the Philippines, Salvatore Siino.

Miraculous claims  

Several miracles attributed to the Virgin of Namacpacan are widely known, including the healing of a young girl named Rosa Roldan who was unable to walk since birth. Before Pope Pius XII died on 9 October 1958, he reportedly saw the Blessed Virgin Mary enshrined in Namacpacan in a dream. He asked where Namacpacan was, but none of his staff were aware of the place's existence; the answer was only revealed after the pontiff's death.

Notes

Bibliography

External links 

National Cultural Treasures of the Philippines
Roman Catholic churches in La Union
Churches in the Roman Catholic Diocese of San Fernando de La Union